John C. Fremont High School is a Title 1 co-educational public high school located in South Los Angeles, California, United States.

Fremont serves several Los Angeles neighborhoods and the unincorporated community of Florence-Graham; some sections of Florence-Graham are jointly zoned to Fremont and David Starr Jordan High School. The Avalon Gardens public housing complex is zoned to Fremont.

The school first opened in 1924 and is named after John C. Frémont. The school is in LAUSD's District 7 and runs on a traditional school system. There are 5,083 students enrolled (2,914 more than the state average), with 11% of the student body African-American and 89% Latino. The name of the school newspaper is "The Pathfinders".

History
Fremont first opened in 1924.  Known in the community for its striking architecture and large quad with a working water fountain in the middle, the San Fernando Earthquake of 1971 forced many buildings on campus to be torn down and rebuilt in a more traditional, earthquake-safe style.  Once enrolled with more than 5,000 students in the early 2000s, Fremont reduced its number of students when South Region High School 2 opened in 2011.

Small school learning communities
John C. Fremont High School was one of the first schools in the United States to have been divided into a "small school" or "academy". The purpose of the small school is to allow personalization of instruction, due to the concern that students may become academically lost in a large, or augmented, campus.
Each of the thirteen Small Learning Communities (SLCs), averaging 400 students each, is given a section of the school campus, and most of the classes take place in that section. For example, one of the small schools might be assigned classes on the first and second floors of the main building. The students of this small school would have the majority of classes in those two floors.

As of July 6, 2000, when the school undergoes reconstitution, the thirteen SLCs will be dissolved and in their place will be six Academies of 500 students each on the three Tracks, consisting of grades 10, 11, and 12. The 9th graders on each Track will have their own Center, with 600 students each.

In September 2003 only four SLCs remained, and the school switched over to a block schedule system instead of the track system. With the reduction of students due to the construction of the South Region schools, the school felt it would be able accommodate the students more efficiently with a block schedule.

There now exists only three SLCs which include, MESA, LSJ, and SGMA. All communities have students of all grade levels. There was once a 9th Grade Academy, a fourth SLC, but soon after the freshman class of 2016 did the school end that SLC.

MAGNET
MAGNET is considered to be the fourth current SLC, but the MAGNET community is a separate school in totality. John C. Fremont High School (school code: 8650) is the host campus for the John C. Fremont Magnet Math Science and Technology High School. (school code: 8651)

Reconstruction

The Los Angeles Unified School District will shut down the school, dismiss all of its staff, and reopen from scratch. The strategy, dubbed "reconstruction", will attempt to address the school's severe drop-out rate, which hovers at around 50%. The strategy is supported by the superintendent, Ramon C. Cortines, and the U.S. Secretary of Education, Arne Duncan. The move is opposed by the United Teachers Los Angeles and many Fremont teachers.

Statistics

Number of Teachers : 211 (State Average: 58)
Academic Performance Index: 459 (State Average: 670)
Ranked 1 out of 10
Students Per Computer: 4 (State Average: 4)
Students Per Teacher: 24 (State Average: 24)
In the reading section of the California Achievement Test (CAT/6), 3% of the students scored at the 75th percentile or higher. 13% of the students scored at the 50th percentile or higher.
In the language section of the CAT/6, 4% of the students scored at the 75th decile or higher. 15% of the students scored at the 50th percentile or higher.

In the math section of the CAT/6, 3% of the students scored at the 75th percentile or higher. 11% of the students scored at the 50th percentile or higher.
In the science section of the CAT/6, 2% of the students scored at the 75th percentile or higher. 11% of the students scored at the 50th percentile or higher.
On the verbal section of the SAT 1, the school average is 360 (State Average: 496).
On the math section of the SAT 1, the school average is 379 (State Average: 519).
52% of the seniors take the SAT (State Average: 39%).
18% of the students take Advanced Placement classes (State Average: 22%).
5% of the student graduates attend a University of California.
15% of the student graduates attend a California State University.
28% of the student graduates attend community college.
25% of the students graduate (State Average: 90%).
Roughly a 75% dropout rate.

Notable alumni

Ricky Bell, National Football League player, College Football Hall of Famer
Mel Bleeker (1920–1996), National Football League player
Joe Caldwell, National Basketball Association player, Olympic gold medalist
Don Cherry, jazz musician
Merl Combs, Major League Baseball player
Clint Conatser, MLB 
Dick Conger, MLB pitcher
Willie Crawford, MLB player
Brock Davis, MLB player
Edward Davis, police chief Los Angeles Police Department.
Eric Davis, MLB player
Bobby Doerr, MLB player, Hall of Famer
Dr. Dre, music producer and recording artist
David Fizdale, NBA general manager, Utah Jazz
Dan Ford, MLB player
David Fulcher, NFL player
Al Grunwald, MLB player
Kenneth Hahn, Los Angeles county supervisor and City Council member
Doug Hansen, MLB player
Dorothy Harrell, baseball player
Candy Harris, MLB player
George Hendrick, MLB player
Bernard Henry, NFL player
Nippy Jones, MLB player
Chet Lemon, MLB player
James Lofton, MLB player 
Gene Mauch, MLB player and manager
Leon McFadden, MLB player

Catfish Metkovich, MLB player
Ron Miller, USC and L.A. Rams end, president and CEO of Walt Disney Productions in the early 1980s
Felicia O'Dell, Youtuber
George Phillips, football player
Leonard Pitts, Pulitzer Prize recipient, author, and Miami Herald columnist
Shorty Rossi, star of reality TV show Pit Boss on Animal Planet 2010–2014
Curtis Rowe, UCLA and NBA player
Bud Stewart, MLB player
Richard Stebbins, 1964 Olympics gold medalist, track & field
George Strock, Life photojournalist
Dwight Taylor, MLB player
Bobby Tolan, MLB player
Raymond Washington, a founder of Crips
Bob Watson, MLB player and executive
Henry Waxman,  representative
Roy Williams, artist and entertainer for The Walt Disney Studios

References

External links

Fremont High School Home page
School Wise Press
Small School Learning community information, Los Angeles Times
Racial tension information
Press conference article

Fremont
Public high schools in California
Educational institutions established in 1924
Fremont
South Los Angeles
1924 establishments in California